Walter Ackerman (born 29 July 1938) is a South African former cricketer. He played in three first-class matches for Eastern Province in 1970/71.

See also
 List of Eastern Province representative cricketers

References

External links
 

1938 births
Living people
South African cricketers
Eastern Province cricketers
Sportspeople from Qonce